Cuauhtlequetzqui or Cuauhtliquetzqui is an Aztec name meaning rising eagle and used by several historical people.

The most important of the people with this name was born between 1250 and 1260, his father also was called Cuauhtlequetzqui, a fact that has caused some confusion. In addition, this personage is projected further into the past, making him the first cuauhtlahto (Mexica leader) "to set out" from Aztlan, Chimalpain places him as ruler from 1116-1153, and even says that he is the same person mentioned from 1280 AD onward.

His historical participation is  extensively mythologised, his first action is in the war against the Texcaltepeca-Malinalcas in 1281, when, as war-leader, he distinguished himself by capturing Copil, the enemy leader, and taking his daughter, Xicomoyahual, to marry. From this union Cohuatzontli was born. With the failure at Chapoltepec in 1281, the myth came to symbolise the foundation of the site, with the legend becoming the justification for Tenochca domination over other peoples, as well as aligning them theologically with the Matalazincas.

With the victory in Chapoltepec, Cuauhtlequetzqui was named lord there. He only ruled for five years,  being killed in the final battle when the warriors of Teotenanco tried, unsuccessfully, to recapture the area of the forest.

Notes

References

Chimalpahin Cuauhtlehuanitzin, Domingo. Las ocho relaciones y el memorial de Colhuacan. CNCA. Mexico 1998. 
Garibay Kintana, Angel Maria. Teogonía e Historia de los mexicanos. Ed. Porrúa. Mexico 1986. 
Torquemada, Fray Juan de. Monarquia Indiana. B.E.U. #84 UNAM. Mexico 1995. 

Aztec people
Aztec